Whisper is a 2017 South Korean television series starring Lee Bo-young, Lee Sang-yoon, Kwon Yul, and Park Se-young. It aired on SBS from March 27 to May 23, 2017 on Mondays and Tuesdays at 22:00 (KST) for 17 episodes.

Synopsis
Shin Young-joo (Lee Bo-young) is a charismatic female section chief police officer who is passionate about her career. With her family facing financial difficulties, she has to undergo much agony and pay off debts for her family. She speaks harshly, but has a heart of gold.

Lee Dong-joon (Lee Sang-yoon) is a virtuous elite judge, brilliant-minded and warm-hearted, and has a willingness to help weak people who need a listening ear.

Both of them join alliances together to uncover defense industry corruption at Taebaek, the nation's biggest law firm, which turns out to be one of the top scandals ever.

Cast

Main

Lee Bo-young as Shin Young-joo
 A section chief of criminal division who fights for her father's unjustified defamation, but her fight backfires and she is dismissed from the police service. In the aftermath,  she goes undercover at Taebaek Law Firm.
Lee Sang-yoon as Lee Dong-joon
Known as a righteous judge who abides by the law and does not waver due to temptation, but he falls into a hopeless situation and has to work for Taebaek Law Firm.
Kwon Yul as Kang Jung-il
A lawyer & Team Manager of corporate mergers and acquisitions in Taebaek Law Firm.
Park Se-young as Choi Soo-yeon
Frivolous, nonchalant and sarcastic. Daughter of the CEO of Taebaek Law Firm.

Supporting

People in Taebaek Law Firm 

Kim Kap-soo as Choi Il-hwan
Lee Ji-hoon as young Choi Il-hwan (cameo)
CEO of Taebaek and father of Soo-yeon.
Kim Hong-fa as Kang Yoo-taek
Lee Si-eon as young Kang Yoo-taek
Jung-il's father. Chairman of Bo-gook Industries.
Moon Hee-kyung as Yoon Jung-ok 
Soo-yeon's mother.
Jo Dal-hwan as Jo Kyung-ho
 Jung-il's close friend.
Yoon Joo-hee as Hwang Bo-yeon
Soo-yeon's personal assistant.
Kim Hyung-mook as Song Tae-gon
Choi Il-hwan's secretary.
Kim Roi-ha as Baek Sang-goo
Henchmen hired by Taebaek.

People around Lee Dong-joon 

Kim Chang-wan as Lee Ho-bum
A Hospital Director of Hangang Hospital and father of Dong-joon.
Sora Jung as Jung Mi-kyung
Dong-joon's step-mother.
Jo Seung-yoon as Lee Dong-min
Son of Dong-joon's father & step-mother.
Heo Jae-ho as Noh Ki-yong 
Dong-joon's subordinate.
Won Mi-kyung as Ahn Myung-sun
Dong-joon's mother.

People around Shin Young-joo 

Kang Shin-il as Shin Chang-ho
Young-joo's father; falsely accused of murder of his close friend to stop him from whistleblowing.
Kim Hae-sook as Kim Sook-hee
Young-joo's mother.
Lee Hyun-jin as Park Hyun-soo
Young-joo's ex-boyfriend, deceived her due to his own selfish needs.
Jung Yi-yeon as Jo Yeon-hwa
Young-joo's close friend, whose identity Young-joo borrowed for a while.

Special appearance 

Choi Hong-il as Kim Sang-shik (Chang-ho's close friend) (Ep. 1)
Jeon Gook-hwan as Jang Hyun-guk (Chief Justice of Supreme Court)
Jo Kyung-sook
Eum Moon-suk as Baek Sang-goo's subordinate (Ep. 6)
Cho Jae-hyun as Lee Tae-joon (Ep. 17)
Seo Ji-hye as Choi Yeon-jin (Ep. 17)

Production
First script reading took place at 2pm on January 24, 2017 at SBS Tanhyeon-dong Production Center, Ilsanseo-gu, Goyang-si, Gyeonggi-do, South Korea. Filming for the drama began on February 1, 2017.

Before it was titled Whisper, its working title was Advance. Writer Park Kyung-soo originally wrote it as a medical drama, then revised as a police drama, until SBS scrapped it completely. But in December 2016, the broadcaster gave the project the go signal, and it was revised as a suspense/legal melodrama.

Lee Bo-young and Lee Sang-yoon reunite again for this miniseries, after previously starred together in 2012 KBS2 drama series My Daughter, Seo Yeong. Lee Bo-young and Kim Hae-sook reunite as daughter and mother after playing the roles of daughter and mother in I Can Hear Your Voice.

Ratings 
In the table below, the blue numbers represent the lowest ratings and the red numbers represent the highest ratings.

Awards and nominations

Notes

References

External links
 Whisper official SBS website 

 

Seoul Broadcasting System television dramas
2017 South Korean television series debuts
Korean-language television shows
Television series by Pan Entertainment
South Korean thriller television series
South Korean legal television series
2017 South Korean television series endings